Atamestane (developmental code name SH-489), also known as metandroden, as well as 1-methylandrosta-1,4-diene-3,17-dione, is a steroidal aromatase inhibitor that was studied in the treatment of cancer. It blocks the production of estrogen in the body. The drug is selective, competitive, and irreversible in its inhibition of aromatase.

See also 
 Boldione (androsta-1,4-diene-3,17-dione)

References

External links 
 Atamestane entry in the public domain NCI Dictionary of Cancer Terms

Androgens and anabolic steroids
Androstanes
Aromatase inhibitors
Enantiopure drugs